WXYG (540 kHz AM) is a radio station licensed to serve the community of Sauk Rapids, Minnesota, United States. The station is part of the Tri-County Broadcasting group and the license is held by the Herbert M. Hoppe Revocable Trust. WXYG broadcasts an album-oriented rock (AOR) format.

History
This station received its original construction permit from the Federal Communications Commission on July 26, 2007. The new station was assigned the call sign WXYG by the FCC on September 10, 2007. The call sign was changed to WMIN on August 12, 2008; to WPPI on December 2, 2008; and back to WXYG on December 14, 2009. This construction permit was scheduled to expire on July 25, 2010.

As of November 8, 2010, WXYG, which had been occasionally testing with a mix of rock and country music since June, began playing Christmas music. The station resumed testing after the holiday season. On May 23, 2011, the FCC granted the station program test authority to begin broadcasting before receiving its broadcast license.

On June 24, 2011, WXYG ended testing and signed on the air with album-oriented rock, branded as "Album Rock 540, The Goat". The station's broadcast license was issued by the FCC on January 27, 2012. The station plays a large library of deep classic rock album cuts.

The station shares towers with three of its sister AM stations. There are seven total towers.

In March 2016 WXYG was granted an FCC construction permit to increase the day power to 850 watts.
Work on the upgraded signal was complete by mid-June 2016. The station now broadcasts with 850 watts during the day. The station celebrated its fifth birthday in late June 2016 by playing its entire library from A-Z. Station program manager Al Neff noted it would take nine to ten days to get through the entire catalog.

Former logo

References

External links
Tri-County Broadcasting

HD Radio stations
Radio stations in Minnesota
Album-oriented rock radio stations in the United States
Radio stations established in 2011
Benton County, Minnesota
Radio stations in St. Cloud, Minnesota